The Nectriaceae comprise a family of fungi in the order Hypocreales. It was circumscribed by brothers Charles and Louis René Tulasne in 1865. In 2020, an Outline of fungi was produced and listed 70 genera and about 1,336 species.

List of genera
As accepted by Wijayawardene et al. 2020; (with number of species)

Albonectria  (1)
Allantonectria  (1)
Allonectella  (2)
Aphanocladium  (4)
Aquanectria  (3)
Atractium  (3)
Baipadisphaeria  (1)
Bisifusarium  (7)
Calonectria  (400)
Calostilbe  (4)
Campylocarpon  (3)
Chaetonectrioides  (1)
Chaetopsina  (19)
Coccinonectria  (2)
Corallomycetella  (4)
Corallonectria  (1)
Corinectria  (3)
Cosmospora  (50)
Cosmosporella  (1)
Curvicladiella  (1)
Cyanochyta  (1)
Cyanonectria  (2)
Cyanophomella  (1)
Cylindrocladiella  (45)
Cylindrodendrum  (4)
Dacryoma  (2)
Dactylonectria  (14)
Dematiocladium  (2)
Fusarium  (ca. 120)
Fusicolla  (18)
Geejayessia  (7)
Gibberella 
Gliocephalotrichum  (13)
Gliocladiopsis  (15)
Ilyonectria  (23)
Macroconia  (5)
Mariannaea  (22)
Microcera  (4)
Murinectria  (4)
Nalanthamala  (6)
Nectria  (29)
Neocalonectria  (1)
Neocosmospora  (84)
Neonectria  (30)
Neothyronectria  (2)
Ophionectria  (39)
Pandanaceomyces  (1)
Paracremonium  (5)
Payosphaeria  (1)
Penicillifer  (7)
Persiciospora  (4)
Pleiocarpon  (3)
Pleogibberella  (3)
Pleurocolla  (1)
Pseudoachroiostachys  (1)
Pseudocosmospora  (13)
Pseudonectria  (17)
Rectifusarium  (2)
Rugonectria  (5)
Sarcopodium  (22)
Stylonectria  (5)
Thelonectria  (46)
Thyronectria  (41)
Varicosporella  (1)
Varicosporellopsis  (1)
Volutella  (127)
Xenoacremonium  (2)
Xenocylindrocladium  (3)
Xenogliocladiopsis  (2)
Xenoleptographium  (1)
Xenonectriella (18)

References

 
Ascomycota families
Taxa named by Edmond Tulasne
Taxa described in 1844